Strange Case of Dr Jekyll and Mr Hyde is a 1886 Gothic novella by Scottish author Robert Louis Stevenson. It follows Gabriel John Utterson, a London-based legal practitioner who investigates a series of strange occurrences between his old friend Dr. Henry Jekyll and a murderous criminal named Edward Hyde.

Strange Case of Dr Jekyll and Mr Hyde is one of the most famous pieces of English literature, and is considered to be a defining book of the gothic horror genre. The novella has also had a sizable impact on popular culture, with the phrase "Jekyll and Hyde" being used in vernacular to refer to people with an outwardly good but sometimes shockingly evil nature.

Inspiration and writing

Stevenson had long been intrigued by the idea of how human personalities can reflect the interplay of good and evil. While still a teenager, he developed a script for a play about William Brodie, which he later reworked with the help of W. E. Henley and which was produced for the first time in 1882. In early 1884, he wrote the short story "Markheim", which he revised in 1884 for publication in a Christmas annual. According to his essay "A Chapter on Dreams" (Scribner's, Jan. 1888), he racked his brains for an idea for a story and had a dream, and upon waking had the intuition for two or three scenes that would appear in the story Strange Case of Dr. Jekyll and Mr. Hyde. Biographer, Graham Balfour, quoted Stevenson's wife, Fanny Stevenson: In the small hours of one morning,[...] I was awakened by cries of horror from Louis. Thinking he had a nightmare, I awakened him. He said angrily: "Why did you wake me? I was dreaming a fine bogey tale." I had awakened him at the first transformation scene.

Lloyd Osbourne, Stevenson's stepson, wrote: "I don't believe that there was ever such a literary feat before as the writing of Dr. Jekyll. I remember the first reading as though it were yesterday. Louis came downstairs in a fever; read nearly half the book aloud; and then, while we were still gasping, he was away again, and busy writing. I doubt if the first draft took so long as three days."

Inspiration may also have come from the writer's friendship with an Edinburgh-based French teacher, Eugene Chantrelle, who was convicted and executed for the murder of his wife in May 1878. Chantrelle, who had appeared to lead a normal life in the city, poisoned his wife with opium. According to author Jeremy Hodges, Stevenson was present throughout the trial and as "the evidence unfolded he found himself, like Dr. Jekyll, 'aghast before the acts of Edward Hyde'." Moreover, it was believed that the teacher had committed other murders both in France and Britain by poisoning his victims at supper parties with a "favourite dish of toasted cheese and opium".

As was customary, Mrs. Stevenson would read the draft and offer her criticisms in the margins. Robert Stevenson was confined to bed at the time from a haemorrhage. In her comments in the manuscript, she observed that in effect the story was really an allegory, but Robert was writing it as a story. After a while, Robert called her back into the bedroom and pointed to a pile of ashes: he had burnt the manuscript in fear that he would try to salvage it, and thus forced himself to start again from nothing, writing an allegorical story as she had suggested. Scholars debate whether he really burnt his manuscript; there is no direct factual evidence for the burning, but it remains an integral part of the history of the novella. In another version of the story, Stevenson came downstairs to read the manuscript for his wife and stepson. Enraged by his wife's criticism, he went back to his room, only to come back later admitting she was right. Then he threw the original draft into the fire, and stopped his wife and stepson from rescuing it.

Stevenson rewrote the story in three to six days. A number of later biographers have alleged that Stevenson was on drugs during the frantic re-write; for example, William Gray's revisionist history A Literary Life (2004) said he used cocaine while other biographers said he used ergot. However, the standard history, according to the accounts of his wife and son (and himself), says he was bed-ridden and sick while writing it. According to Osbourne, "The mere physical feat was tremendous and, instead of harming him, it roused and cheered him inexpressibly". He continued to refine the work for four to six weeks after the initial revision. The novella was written in the southern English seaside town of Bournemouth, where Stevenson had moved to benefit from its sea air and warmer climate.

The name Jekyll was borrowed from the Reverend Walter Jekyll, a friend of Stevenson and younger brother of horticulturalist and landscape designer Gertrude Jekyll.

Plot
Gabriel John Utterson and his cousin Richard Enfield reach the door of a large house on their weekly walk. Enfield tells Utterson that months ago, at three o'clock in the morning, he saw a sinister-looking man named Edward Hyde trample a young girl after accidentally bumping into her. Enfield forced Hyde to pay her family £100 to avoid a scandal. Hyde brought Enfield to this door and gave him a cheque signed by a reputable gentleman later revealed to be Doctor Henry Jekyll, Utterson's friend and client. Utterson fears Hyde is blackmailing Jekyll, as Jekyll recently changed his will to make Hyde the sole beneficiary in the event of Jekyll's death or disappearance. When Utterson tries to discuss Hyde with Jekyll, Jekyll says he can get rid of Hyde when he wants and asks him to drop the matter.

A year later in October, a servant sees Hyde beat Sir Danvers Carew, another one of Utterson's clients, to death and leave behind half a broken cane. The police contact Utterson, who leads officers to Hyde's apartment. Hyde has vanished, but they find the other half of the broken cane, which Utterson recognizes as one he had given to Jekyll. Utterson visits Jekyll, who produces a note, allegedly written to Jekyll by Hyde, apologizing for the trouble that he has caused. However, Hyde's handwriting is similar to Jekyll's own, leading Utterson to conclude that Jekyll forged the note to protect Hyde.

For two months, Jekyll reverts to his former sociable manner but, in early January, he starts refusing visitors. Dr. Hastie Lanyon, a mutual friend of Jekyll and Utterson, dies of shock after receiving information relating to Jekyll. Before his death, Lanyon gives Utterson a letter to be opened after Jekyll's death or disappearance. In late February, during another walk with Enfield, Utterson starts a conversation with Jekyll at his laboratory window. Jekyll suddenly slams the window shut and disappears, shocking and concerning Utterson.

In early March, Jekyll's butler, Mr. Poole, visits Utterson and says Jekyll has secluded himself in his laboratory for weeks. Utterson and Poole break into the laboratory, where they find Hyde's body wearing Jekyll's clothes, apparently having killed himself. They find a letter from Jekyll to Utterson. Utterson reads Lanyon's letter, then Jekyll's. Lanyon's letter reveals his deterioration resulted from the shock of seeing Hyde drink a serum that turned him into Jekyll. Jekyll's letter explains he held himself to strict moral standards publicly, but indulged in unstated vices and struggled with shame. He found a way to transform himself and thereby indulge his vices without fear of detection. Jekyll's transformed body, Hyde, was evil, self-indulgent, and uncaring to anyone but himself. Initially, Jekyll controlled the transformations with the serum, but one night in August, he became Hyde involuntarily in his sleep.

Jekyll resolved to cease becoming Hyde. Despite this, one night he had a moment of weakness and drank the serum. Hyde, his desires having been caged for so long, killed Carew. Horrified, Jekyll tried more adamantly to stop the transformations. Then, in early January, he transformed involuntarily while awake. Far from his laboratory and hunted by the police as a murderer, Hyde needed help to avoid capture. He wrote to Lanyon in Jekyll's hand, asking his friend to bring chemicals from his laboratory. In Lanyon's presence, Hyde mixed the chemicals, drank the serum, and transformed into Jekyll. The shock of the sight instigated Lanyon's deterioration and death. Meanwhile, Jekyll's involuntary transformations increased in frequency and required ever larger doses of the serum to reverse. It was one of these transformations that caused Jekyll to slam his window shut on Utterson.

Eventually, the supply of salt used in the serum ran low, and subsequent batches prepared from new stocks failed to work. Jekyll speculated that the original ingredient had some impurity that made it work. Realizing that he would stay transformed as Hyde, Jekyll wrote out a full account of the events and locked himself in his laboratory with the intent to keep Hyde imprisoned and, as Poole and Utterson smashed down the door to the laboratory, committed suicide by poison.

Characters

Gabriel John Utterson
Gabriel John Utterson, a lawyer and close loyal friend of Jekyll and Lanyon for many years, is the protagonist of the story. Utterson is a measured and at all times emotionless bachelor – who nonetheless seems believable, trustworthy, tolerant of the faults of others, and indeed genuinely likeable. However, Utterson is not immune to guilt, as, while he is quick to investigate and judge the faults of others even for the benefit of his friends, Stevenson states that "he was humbled to the dust by the many ill things he had done". Whatever these "ill things" may be, he does not partake in gossip or other views of the upper class out of respect for his fellow man. Often the last remaining friend of the downfallen, he finds an interest in others' downfalls, which creates a spark of interest not only in Jekyll but also regarding Hyde. He concludes that human downfall results from indulging oneself in topics of interest. As a result of this line of reasoning, he lives life as a recluse and "dampens his taste for the finer items of life". Utterson concludes that Jekyll lives life as he wishes by enjoying his occupation.

Dr. Henry Jekyll/Mr. Edward Hyde

Dr. Jekyll is a "large, well-made, smooth-faced man of fifty with something of a slyish cast", who sometimes feels he is battling between the good and evil within himself, leading to the struggle between his dual personalities of Henry Jekyll and Edward Hyde. He has spent a great part of his life trying to repress evil urges that were not fitting for a man of his stature. He creates a serum, or potion, in an attempt to separate this hidden evil from his personality. In doing so, Jekyll transformed into the smaller, younger, cruel, remorseless, and evil Hyde. Jekyll has many friends and an amiable personality, but as Hyde, he becomes mysterious and violent. As time goes by, Hyde grows in power. After taking the potion repeatedly, he no longer relies upon it to unleash his inner demon, i.e., his alter ego. Eventually, Hyde grows so strong that Jekyll becomes reliant on the potion to remain conscious throughout the book.

Richard Enfield
Richard Enfield is Utterson's cousin and is a well-known "man about town". He first sees Hyde at about three in the morning in an episode that is well documented as Hyde is running over a little girl. He is the person who mentions to Utterson the actual personality of Jekyll's friend, Hyde. Enfield witnessed Hyde recklessly running over a little girl in the street and the group of witnesses, with the girl's parents and other residents, force Hyde into writing a cheque for the girl's family. Enfield discovers that Jekyll signed the cheque, which is genuine. He says that Hyde is disgusting-looking but finds himself stumped when asked to describe the man.

Dr. Hastie Lanyon
A longtime friend of Jekyll, Hastie Lanyon disagrees with Jekyll's "scientific" concepts, which Lanyon describes as "...too fanciful". He is the first person to discover Hyde's true identity (Hyde transforms himself back into Jekyll in Lanyon's presence). Lanyon helps Utterson solve the case when he describes the letter given to him by Jekyll and his thoughts and reactions to the transformation. After he witnesses the transformation process (and subsequently hears Jekyll's private confession, made to him alone), Lanyon becomes shocked into critical illness and, later, death.

Mr. Poole
Poole is Jekyll's butler who has been employed by him for many years. Poole serves Jekyll faithfully and attempts to be loyal to his master, but the growing reclusiveness of and changes in his master cause him growing concern. Finally fearing that his master has been murdered and that his murderer, Mr. Hyde, is residing in Jekyll's chambers, Poole is driven into going to Utterson and joining forces with him to uncover the truth. He chops down the door towards Jekyll's lab in five strong swipes to aid Utterson in the climax.

Inspector Newcomen
Utterson joins this Scotland Yard inspector after the murder of Sir Danvers Carew. They explore Hyde's loft in Soho and discover evidence of his depraved life.

Sir Danvers Carew, MP
A kind, 70-year-old Member of Parliament. The maid claims that Hyde, in a murderous rage, killed Carew in the streets of London on the night of 18 October. At the time of his death, Carew is carrying on his person a letter addressed to Utterson, and the broken half of one of Jekyll's walking sticks is found on his body.

Maid
A maid, whose employerpresumably JekyllHyde had once visited, is the only person who has witnessed the murder of Sir Danvers Carew. She saw Hyde murder Carew with Jekyll's cane and his feet. Having fainted after seeing what happened, she then wakes up and rushes to the police, thus initiating the murder case of Sir Danvers Carew.

Analysis of themes

Literary genres that critics have applied as a framework for interpreting the novel include religious allegory, fable, detective story, sensation fiction, doppelgänger literature, Scottish devil tales, and Gothic novel.

Dualities

The novella is frequently interpreted as an examination of the duality of human nature, usually expressed as an inner struggle between good and evil, with variations such as human versus animal, civility versus barbarism sometimes substituted, the main point being that of an essential inner struggle between the one and other, and that the failure to accept this tension results in evil, or barbarity, or animal violence, being projected onto others. In Freudian theory, the thoughts and desires banished to the unconscious mind motivate the behaviour of the conscious mind. Banishing evil to the unconscious mind in an attempt to achieve perfect goodness can result in the development of a Mr. Hyde-type aspect to one's character. 

In Christian theology, Satan's fall from Heaven is due to his refusal to accept that he is a created being (that he has a dual nature) and is not God. This idea is suggested when Hyde says to Lanyon, shortly before drinking the famous potion: "your sight shall be blasted by a prodigy to stagger the unbelief of Satan." This is because, in Christianity, pride (to consider oneself as without sin or without evil) is a sin, as it is the precursor to evil itself.

In his discussion of the novel, Vladimir Nabokov argues that the "good versus evil" view of the novel is misleading, as Jekyll himself is not, by Victorian standards, a morally good person in some cases.

Id, ego and super-ego
According to the theory about the id, ego and super-ego, Mr. Hyde is the id which is driven by primal urges, instincts, and immediate gratification, the superego is represented by the expectations and morals of Victorian society, and Dr. Jekyll is the rational and conscious ego which acts as a balance between the id and superego. When Jekyll transforms into Hyde, the ego is suppressed, and the id is no longer held back by either the ego or the superego.

Public vs. private

The work is commonly associated today with the Victorian concern over the public and private division, the individual's sense of playing a part and the class division of London. In this respect, the novella has also been noted as "one of the best guidebooks of the Victorian era" because of its piercing description of the fundamental dichotomy of the 19th century "outward respectability and inward lust", as this period had a tendency for social hypocrisy.

Scottish nationalism vs. union with Britain

Another common interpretation sees the novella's duality as representative of Scotland and the Scottish character. In this reading, the duality represents the national and linguistic dualities inherent in Scotland's relationship with the wider Britain and the English language, respectively, and also the repressive effects of the Church of Scotland on the Scottish character. A further parallel is also drawn with the city of Edinburgh itself, Stevenson's birthplace, which consists of two distinct parts: the old medieval section historically inhabited by the city's poor, where the dark crowded slums were rife with all types of crime, and the modern Georgian area of wide spacious streets representing respectability.

Addiction 
Some scholars have argued that addiction or substance abuse is a central theme in the novella. Stevenson's depiction of Mr. Hyde is reminiscent of descriptions of substance abuse in the nineteenth century. Daniel L. Wright describes Dr. Jekyll as "not so much a man of conflicted personality as a man suffering from the ravages of addiction". Patricia Comitini argues that the central duality in the novella is in fact not Dr. Jekyll and Mr. Hyde but rather Dr. Jekyll/Mr. Hyde and Utterson, where Utterson represents the rational, unaddicted, ideal Victorian subject devoid of forbidden desires, and Dr. Jekyll/Mr. Hyde constitutes his opposite.

Darwin
The publication of The Origin of Species had a big impact on the Victorian society. Many did not fully understand the concepts of evolution, and assumed Darwin meant humans had evolved directly from apes, and that if it was possible to evolve into humans, it was also possible to degenerate into something more ape-like and primitive. Mr. Hyde is described as a more primitive and less developed version of Dr. Jekyll, and gradually Hyde becomes more bestial as his degeneration progress.

Reception

Publication

The book was initially sold as a paperback for one shilling in the U.K. and for one penny in the U.S. These books were called "shilling shockers" or penny dreadfuls. The American publisher issued the book on 5 January 1886, four days before the first appearance of the U.K. edition issued by Longmans; Scribner's published 3,000 copies, only 1,250 of them bound in cloth. Initially, stores did not stock it until a review appeared in The Times on 25 January 1886 giving it a favourable reception. Within the next six months, close to 40 thousand copies were sold. As Stevenson's biographer Graham Balfour wrote in 1901, the book's success was probably due rather to the "moral instincts of the public" than to any conscious perception of the merits of its art. It was read by those who never read fiction and quoted in pulpit sermons and in religious papers. By 1901, it was estimated to have sold over 250,000 copies in the United States.

Stage version

Although the book had initially been published as a "shilling shocker", it was an immediate success and one of Stevenson's best-selling works. Stage adaptations began in Boston and London and soon moved all across England and then towards his home country of Scotland.

The first stage adaptation followed the story's initial publication in 1886. Richard Mansfield bought the rights from Stevenson and worked with Boston author Thomas Russell Sullivan to write a script. The resulting play added to the cast of characters and some elements of romance to the plot. The addition of female characters to the originally male-centred plot continued in later adaptations of the story. The first performance of the play took place in the Boston Museum in May 1887. The lighting effects and makeup for Jekyll's transformation into Hyde created horrified reactions from the audience, and the play was so successful that production followed in London. After a successful 10 weeks in London in 1888, Mansfield was forced to close down production. The hysteria surrounding the Jack the Ripper serial murders led even those who only played murderers on stage to be considered suspects. When Mansfield was mentioned in London newspapers as a possible suspect for the crimes, he shut down production.

Adaptations

There have been numerous adaptations of the novella, including over 120 stage and film versions alone.

There have also been many audio recordings of the novella, with some of the more famous readers including Tom Baker, Roger Rees, Christopher Lee, Anthony Quayle, Martin Jarvis, Tim Pigott-Smith, John Hurt, Ian Holm, Gene Lockhart, Richard Armitage, John Sessions, Alan Howard, Rory Kinnear and Richard E. Grant.

A 1990 musical based on the story was created by Frank Wildhorn, Steve Cuden, and Leslie Bricusse.

There have also been several video games based on the story.

Illustrated versions
S. G. Hulme Beaman illustrated a 1930s edition, and in 1948 Mervyn Peake provided the newly founded Folio Society with memorable illustrations for the story.

See also
 The Private Memoirs and Confessions of a Justified Sinner by James Hogg, one possible source of inspiration
 The Hulk, a fictional superhero whose creation was inspired by a combination of Frankenstein and Dr. Jekyll and Mr. Hyde.
 Louis Vivet, a mental patient diagnosed with dissociative identity disorder. His case caught Frederic W. H. Myers's attention, who wrote to Stevenson after the story was published. Stevenson was polite in his response, but rejected the interpretation that Dr Jekyll was suffering from DID.
 British singer Example directly references Dr. Jekyll and Mr. Hyde in his song "Skies Don't Lie". The song lyrics, referring to the duality of human character, read "don't discriminate Jekyll or Hyde, everybody's different at night".
 The band  Riverside references Mr. Hyde in their song "Parasomnia", from the album "Rapid Eye Movement"
 Satanik, an Italian noir comic book created in December 1964: Marny Bannister, a female chemistry scientist whose face is marked by an angioma, develops a drug that transforms her into a fascinating woman. The drug has an unexpected side effect, making her a criminal mastermind.
 Five Finger Death Punch, a heavy metal band, has written a song by the name of Jekyll and Hyde in their sixth album Got Your Six.
 Ice Nine Kills, a metalcore band has written a song by the name of Me, Myself & Hyde. The song is from their fourth album Every Trick in the Book.
 Monster High, a fashion doll franchise, has two iterations of the son of Dr. Jekyll and Mr. Hyde. The first iteration being a boy named Jackson Jekyll who appears in the animated web series and animated films, and the second being Mr. Komos, who appears in the 2022 film, Monster High: The Movie.

References

Further reading
 Katherine B. Linehan, ed. (2003). Strange Case of Dr Jekyll and Mr Hyde. Norton Critical Edition, W. W. Norton & Co. Text, annotations, contextual essays, and criticism.

External links 

 
Strange Case of Dr Jekyll and Mr Hyde from Internet Archive. Many antiquarian illustrated editions.
 
 "The Beast Within", Freudian fable, sexual morality tale, gay allegory – the novella has inspired as many interpretations as it has film adaptations. By James Campbell, The Guardian, 13 December 2008
 1950 Theatre Guild on the Air radio adaptation at Internet Archive
 

 
Short stories by Robert Louis Stevenson
1886 British novels
1886 science fiction novels
British novellas
Novels set in London
British Gothic novels
Victorian novels
Science fiction horror novels
Human experimentation in fiction
Novels adapted into comics
British novels adapted into films
British novels adapted into plays
Novels adapted into radio programs
British novels adapted into television shows
Novels adapted into video games
Weird fiction novels
Articles containing video clips